Gonzalo Vázquez Vela (July 3, 1893 - November 7, 1963) was a Mexican politician. He was governor of Veracruz and became leader of the Secretariat of Public Education (SEP) in 1935.

References

1893 births
1963 deaths
Governors of Veracruz
20th-century Mexican politicians
Politicians from Mexico City
Mexican Secretaries of Education